"Teacher's Pet" is the fourth episode of the first season of the television series Buffy the Vampire Slayer. The episode originally aired on March 24, 1997, attracting 2.0 million viewers. The episode was written by co-executive producer David Greenwalt and directed by Bruce Seth Green. Xander and the other high school boys fall for a substitute teacher who has the aspects of a killer preying mantis.

Plot
After a biology class, Dr. Gregory is killed by an unseen monster, which only shows a pair of large eyes and an insectile limb. The next day, Buffy is alarmed by news of Gregory's disappearance, but the boys in her class are more interested in the beautiful substitute teacher, Natalie French (Musetta Vander), who seems to have a fixation on insects, especially the praying mantis. French suggests making model egg sacs for the upcoming science fair and asks the class for help. She selects Blayne as her lab partner for that day, to be followed by Xander the next day.

Cordelia finds Gregory's headless body inside a cafeteria refrigerator. That night Buffy goes into the park and confronts a vampire who has a large claw in place of his right hand. They fight but are interrupted by the police and the vampire escapes. He encounters French while she is walking home with groceries and flees in terror, indicating that French is not human.

The next day Buffy is late for her biology class and is horrified to watch as French seems to sense somebody at the door and then turns her head 180 degrees to see who it is. After the class, French claims to have left supplies at home so she asks Xander to come over to her house that evening and work on the egg-sac project there instead.

Back in the library, Buffy realizes that Blayne never returned home from helping French. Giles recalls a creature known as the "She-Mantis", or the "Virgin Thief", which preys on virgin males to fertilize its young. That night, Xander arrives at French's house to find her wearing a tight dress and acting in a sexually suggestive manner. She offers him a drink, which he takes and then collapses. She turns into her mantis form and takes his body to a cage in the basement, where he wakes up next to Blayne.

Meanwhile, Willow calls Xander's mother and finds out that he is not home. The Scoobies then go to the house where French supposedly lives, but find a retired teacher there whose name the mantis has stolen. Desperate to find the real house before it is too late, Buffy tracks the one-handed vampire and forces him to locate the correct house. Buffy breaks through the window just as French in mantis form is about to mate with Xander. She burns the monster with insect repellent while the others free Xander and Blayne. Giles and Buffy, using recorded bat sonar, send French into convulsions so Buffy can hack her to death with a machete.

The next day, Buffy sadly puts Gregory's glasses back in his closet, not noticing that a sac of she-mantis eggs is attached to the bottom of a shelf and one begins to hatch.

Broadcast and reception
"Teacher's Pet" was first broadcast on The WB on March 24, 1997. It pulled in an audience of 2 million households.

Noel Murray of The A.V. Club gave the episode a grade of B. He wrote that the "fundamental goofiness" of the premise was a "strike against" the episode, but that it benefited from "depth of characterization". Murray commented that the episode's subtext was the teenage fear of the reproductive practicalities of sex. A BBC review said that the episode "struggles to tread new ground" and was "uncomfortably paced". However, the review praised the effects of the praying mantis and some "delightful moments". DVD Talk's Phillip Duncan was somewhat disappointed with the episode, calling it a "by-the-book monster thriller set in the high school". Despite the standardness, he felt that it was still "worth watching".

References

External links
 

Buffy the Vampire Slayer (season 1) episodes
1997 American television episodes
Television episodes written by David Greenwalt
Television episodes about insects

it:Episodi di Buffy l'ammazzavampiri (prima stagione)#La mantide